NW4 can refer to:

 NW postcode area
 National Waterway 4 (India)